SMS Comet was an aviso of the German Kaiserliche Marine (Imperial Navy) built in the early 1890s, second and final member of the  that include one other vessel, . Intended to screen the main fleet against attacking torpedo boats, Comet was armed with a battery of four  guns. Her design suffered from several defects, including excessive vibration and poor handling in heavy seas, both of which could not be corrected. These problems limited the ship's career to several periods of sea trials as the navy attempted to remedy the problems that plagued the ship. They had no success, and Comet was instead decommissioned in mid-1896 and was later converted into a storage hulk for naval mines. She was ultimately broken up in 1921.

Design

With previous avisos built for the German fleet, the designers had attempted to build vessels that could serve as scouts for the main fleet as well as defend it against hostile torpedo boats that threatened the larger ironclad warships. The naval command decided in 1888 that the next class of avisos—the Meteor design—should focus solely on anti-torpedo boat duties. Smaller and faster than the preceding s, the Meteors were also badly unstable and poor sea boats, and they suffered from severe vibration at high speed. These defects could not be remedied, and as a result, they had short careers.

Her propulsion system consisted of two vertical 3-cylinder triple expansion engines. Steam for the engines was provided by four coal-fired locomotive boilers. Comet had a crew of 7 officers and 108 enlisted men.

As built, the ship was armed with four  SK L/30 guns placed in single pivot mounts, two side-by-side forward, and two side-by-side aft. The guns were supplied with between 462 and 680 rounds of ammunition. Comet also carried three  torpedo tubes, one mounted submerged in the bow and the other two in deck-mounted launchers on the broadside.

Service history

The contract for Comet was awarded to the AG Vulcan shipyard in Stettin, but her keel laying was delayed until November 1891 so the navy could gather experience from the initial trials of Comets sister ship, . The commander of the Kaiserliche Werft (Imperial Shipyard) in Kiel, Otto von Diederichs performed the christening at her launching ceremony on 15 November 1892. After completing fitting-out, the navy conducted acceptance trials that concluded on 14 April 1893. The ship then steamed to Kiel, where she was commissioned on 29 April. She conducted further sea trials until 6 July, when she was decommissioned for the year.

Comet was recommissioned briefly in 1894, serving briefly from 5 to 30 June under the command of Korvettenkapitän (corvette captain) Henning von Holtzendorff. The ship remained out of service through 1895, though modifications were made in an attempt to correct some of her defects. She was recommissioned on 22 January for another round of sea trials that lasted until 26 April. These were conducted in the North Sea, under the command of Kapitänleutnant (captain lieutenant) Ludwig Bruch. The ship was transferred to Wilhelmshaven on 2 May, where she was decommissioned again. Relocated to Kiel the following year, she saw no further active service. As with her sister, Comets career was limited by the serious defects in her design.

An order from the naval command reclassified Comet as a light cruiser on 21 February 1899, and in mid-1901, she was transferred to Danzig, along with three other old ships. On 3 May 1904, she was transferred to the list of harbor ships, and she was employed as a harbor defense ship in Danzig beginning at the same time. The ship was struck from the naval register on 24 June 1911 and in June 1914, she was towed to Emden, where she was used as a mine storage hulk to support the light cruiser . Comet was broken up in Hamburg in 1921.

Notes

References

 
 
 

Meteor-class avisos